Afromurzinia is a genus of tiger moths in the family Erebidae and found in the Afrotropics. The genus was erected by Vladimir Viktorovitch Dubatolov and Patrick G. Haynes in 2008.

Species
 Afromurzinia fletcheri (Kiriakoff, 1958)
 Afromurzinia lutescens (Walker, 1855)
 Afromurzinia sublutescens (Kiriakoff, 1958)

References 
 Dubatolov, Vladimir V. & Haynes, Patrick G. (2008). "Reviewing the African tiger-moth genera 1. New genera from the late Prof. V.S. Murzin's collection (Lepidoptera: Arctiidae)". Atalanta. 39 (1-4): 356-366.

Spilosomina
Moth genera